The Honorary Golden Bear is the Berlin International Film Festival's honorary award for lifetime achievement by important figures in the world of film.

The award was first presented in 1982. The award was not presented in 1983, 1984, 1985, 1986, 1987, 1991, 1992, and 2021. The award is presented for an exceptional artistic career and is given to the guest of honour of the Homage.

List of honorees

References

External links 

 Berlinale website

Golden Bear Honorary Award
 Winners
 
Lifetime achievement awards
Awards established in 1982
1982 establishments in Germany